This is a list of stadiums currently and previously used in Major League Lacrosse, a men's field lacrosse league in the United States and Canada.

See also
 List of current Major League Baseball stadiums
 List of current National Football League stadiums
 List of Major League Soccer stadiums
 List of National Basketball Association arenas
 List of National Hockey League arenas

References

stadiums
Major
Major League Lacrosse
Major League Lacrosse